Ambrose 'Amby' Power (17 February 1884 – 26 February 1960) was an Irish hurler who played as a centre-back for the Clare senior team.

Power made his first appearance for the team around 1908 and became a regular player over the next decade. During that time he won one All-Ireland winner's medal and one Leinster winner's medal. In 1914 Power became the first Clareman to captain his county to the All-Ireland title.

At club level, Power played with Tulla and Carrahan and won two county championship winners' medals in a career that spanned the first two decades of the 20th century.

References

1884 births
1960 deaths
All-Ireland Senior Hurling Championship winners
Clare inter-county hurlers
Drinking establishment owners
Tulla (Clare) hurlers